Stittsville is an  album by saxophonist Sonny Stitt recorded in 1960 and originally released on the Roost label.

Reception
The Allmusic site awarded the album 3 stars.

Track listing 
All compositions by Sonny Stitt except as indicated
 "Angel Eyes" (Matt Dennis, Earl Brent) - 3:13  
 "It All Depends on You" (Ray Henderson, Buddy DeSylva, Lew Brown) - 2:50  
 "Stormy Thursday" - 3:22 
 "Embraceable You" (George Gershwin, Ira Gershwin) - 2:35 
 "It Could Happen to You" (Johnny Burke, Jimmy Van Heusen) - 3:23 
 "But Not For Me (Gershwin, Gershwin) - 3:07 
 "Memories of You" (Eubie Blake, Andy Razaf) - 5:09 
 "I Cried for You" (Gus Arnheim, Arthur Freed, Abe Lyman) 3:15 
 "Bright as Snow" - 2:44 
 "Spinning" - 2:26

Personnel 
Sonny Stitt - alto saxophone 1,4,10, tenor saxophone all others
Jimmy Jones - piano
Unknown musician - bass
Roy Haynes - drums

References 

1960 albums
Roost Records albums
Sonny Stitt albums
Albums produced by Teddy Reig